Buellia subeffigurata is a species of crustose lichen in the family Caliciaceae. Found in South Africa, it was formally described as a new species in 2021 by John Alan Elix, Helmut Mayrhofer, and Wolfgang Wetschnig. Here the saxicolous lichen was found growing on quartziferous rock. The species epithet refers to its subeffigurate marginal lobes (i.e., more or less irregular or without form). The results of standard chemical spot tests are: thallus K+ (yellow), P+ (yellow-orange), and C−. Buellia subeffigurata contains thiophanic acid as a major secondary chemical, and isoarthothelin and atranorin as minor compounds.

See also
List of Buellia species

References

subeffigurata
Lichen species
Lichens described in 2021
Lichens of South Africa
Taxa named by John Alan Elix
Taxa named by Helmut Mayrhofer